Bohunice may refer to places:

Czech Republic
Bohunice (Prachatice District), a municipality and village in the South Bohemian Region
Bohunice, a village and part of Všemyslice in the South Bohemian Region
Brno-Bohunice, a district of Brno

Slovakia
Bohunice, Ilava District
Bohunice, Levice District
Jaslovské Bohunice
Bohunice Nuclear Power Plant in the municipality